Natty Universal Dread 1973–1979 is a 3-CD-Box-set by Big Youth, released in 2001.

Track listing
All tracks composed by Manley Buchanan; except where indicated

CD1: Hot Stock 1973 
 "Chucky No Lucky"
 "Waterhouse Rock"
 "Hot Cross Bun"
 "Roll River Jordan" (Sugar Minott)
 "Children Children"
 "Mr. Buddy"
 "Hot Stock"
 "Downtown Kingston Pollution"
 "Hell Is for Heroes"
 "African Daughter"
 "Things in the Light"
 "Sky Juice"
 "Not Long Ago"
 "Is Dread in a Babylon"
 "I Pray Thee Continually"
 "Streets in Africa"

CD2: Reggae Phenomenon 1973–1975 
 "Give Praises"
 "Mama Look"
 "Reggae Phenomenon"
 "Battle of the Giants, Part 1"
 "Battle of the Giants, Part 2"
 "Plead I Cause"
 "Hip Ki Do"
 "Riverton City2
 "Love and Happiness" (Al Green, Mabon "Teenie" Hodges)
 "Weeping in the Night (Joy in the Morning)"
 "Every Nigger Is a Star"
 "My Time" (Buchanan, Gregory Isaacs)
 "Natty Universal Dread"
 "Jim Screechy"

CD3: Hotter Fire 1975–1979 
 "Messiah Garvey" (Extended)
 "Wolf In Sheep Clothing" (Version 1)
 "Wolf In Sheep Clothing" (Version 2)
 "Keep Your Dread" (Phil Pratt)
 "I Light and I Salvation"
 "Hit the Road Jack" (Percy Mayfield)
 Leroy Smart & Big Youth – "Keep On Trying"
 "Jah Man of Syreen"
 "Dread High Ranking"
 "Hotter Fire"
 "Miss Lou Ring a Ding"
 "Same Something"
 "Dread Is the Best"
 "Ten Against One"
 "River Boat"
 Junior Byles & Big Youth – "Sugar, Sugar" (Chuck Willis, Andy Kim, Jeff Barry)
 "The Wise Sheep"
 "Jah Jah Love Them" (Extended)
 "The Upful One"
 "Can't Take Wah Happen on a West"
 "Political Confusion"

Personnel
 Big Youth – Main Performer, Vocals, Percussion
 Musicians – Soul Syndicate, Big Youth Orchestra, Negusa Nagast All Stars, The Ark Angels
 Bass – George "Fully" Fullwood, Jackie Jackson
 Drums – Carlton "Santa" Davis
 Rhythm Guitar – Tony Chin
 Lead Guitar – Earl "Chinna" Smith as Mmelchezidek
 Keyboard – Keith McLeod, Earl "Wire" Lindo
 Piano – Keith Sterling
 Trombone – Vin Gordon
 Alto Saxophone – "Deadly" Headley Bennett, Herman Marquis
 Tenor Saxophone – Glen DaCosta
 Trumpet – David Madden, Arnold Brackenridge, Bobby Ellis
 Harmonica – Jimmy Becker
 Percussion – Noel "Skully" Simms, Keith Sterling, Sylvan Morris, Uziah "Sticky" Thompson, Big Youth
 Backing Vocals – Barry Llewellyn, Earl Morgan, Leroy Sibbles, I Threes, Gregory Isaacs, Garnett Mirriam

Recording Information

 Recording: Harry J Studio, Kingston, Jamaica & Joe Gibbs Studio, Kingston, Jamaica & Randy's, Kingston, Jamaica

Other information

All tracks produced by Manley Augustus Buchanan aka Big Youth except:
 CD1, tracks 1 & 2 produced by Joel Gibson
 CD3, track 1 produced by Jimmy Lindo
 CD3, track 4 produced by Phil Pratt

References

Big Youth albums
2001 compilation albums